Peleg Sprague (April 27, 1793 – October 13, 1880) was a United States representative and a United States senator from Maine and a United States district judge of the United States District Court for the District of Massachusetts.

Education and career

Born on April 27, 1793, in Duxbury, Massachusetts, Sprague received an Artium Baccalaureus degree in 1812 from Harvard University, attended Litchfield Law School, then read law in 1815. He was admitted to the bar and entered private practice in Augusta, District of Maine (then part of Massachusetts) from 1815 to 1817. He continued private practice in Hallowell, Kennebec County, District of Maine (State of Maine from March 15, 1820) from 1817 to 1821. He was a member of the Maine House of Representatives from 1821 to 1822. He was a corporate member of the Maine Historical Society. He resumed private practice in Hallowell from 1822 to 1824.

Congressional service

Sprague was elected as a member of the National Republican Party from Maine's 4th congressional district to the United States House of Representatives of the 19th, 20th and 21st United States Congresses and served from March 4, 1825, until his resignation, effective March 3, 1829, having been elected United States Senator. He was elected to the United States Senate from Maine and served from March 4, 1829, to January 1, 1835, when he resigned. Following his departure from Congress, Sprague resumed private practice in Boston, Massachusetts from 1836 to 1841. In 1840, he served as a presidential elector on the Whig ticket in 1840.

Opposition to Indian removal

During his time in the Senate, Sprague became a prominent campaigner against President Andrew Jackson's controversial policy of Indian removal, whereby Indians in the Southern states were to be forcibly relocated to West of the Mississippi River. Sprague argued that the policy was corrupt as it largely relied on bribes for support, and he also attacked the plan for its immorality and lack of humanity, claiming that the Indians would receive no assistance in starting new lives in an alien environment.

Federal judicial service

Sprague was nominated by President John Tyler on July 15, 1841, to a seat on the United States District Court for the District of Massachusetts vacated by Judge John Davis. He was confirmed by the United States Senate on July 16, 1841, and received his commission the same day. His service terminated on March 13, 1865, due to his resignation.

Later career and death

Following his resignation from the federal bench, Sprague resumed private practice in Boston from 1865 to 1880. He died on October 13, 1880, in Boston. He was interred in Mount Auburn Cemetery in Cambridge, Massachusetts.

Family

Sprague was the grandfather of Charles F. Sprague, a United States Representative from Massachusetts.

References

Sources
 
 
 Peleg Sprague. 1815–35 Chapter in: William Willis, A history of the law, the courts, and the lawyers of Maine, from its first colonization to the early part of the present century (1863)

1793 births
1880 deaths
Members of the Maine House of Representatives
United States senators from Maine
Politicians from Augusta, Maine
Judges of the United States District Court for the District of Massachusetts
United States federal judges appointed by John Tyler
19th-century American judges
Harvard University alumni
National Republican Party United States senators
Burials at Mount Auburn Cemetery
Maine Whigs
19th-century American politicians
National Republican Party members of the United States House of Representatives from Maine